Epigrypera is a genus of moths of the family Noctuidae. The genus was erected by George Hampson in 1910.

Species
Epigrypera argenticincta Hampson, 1910 Malaysia
Epigrypera eriogona Hampson, 1910 Borneo

References

Acontiinae